Irvine F.C. may refer to:

Irvine F.C. (1875), a former association football club from Irvine, North Ayrshire which existed from 1875–1881.
Irvine F.C. (1877), a former association football club from Irvine, North Ayrshire which existed from 1877–1899.
Irvine Meadow XI F.C., an association football club from Irvine, North Ayrshire which plays in the West of Scotland Football League.
Irvine Victoria F.C., an association football club from Irvine, North Ayrshire which plays in the West of Scotland Football League.
Irvine RFC, a rugby union club from Irvine, North Ayrshire.